Philip Broberg (born 25 June 2001) is a Swedish professional ice hockey defenceman currently playing for the  Edmonton Oilers of the National Hockey League (NHL). He was drafted eighth overall by the Oilers in the 2019 NHL Entry Draft.

Playing career
Broberg originally played as a youth within the Örebro HK organization before moving to continue in the J20 SuperElit with AIK during the 2017–18 season. As a 17-year-old, he made his professional debut in the HockeyAllsvenskan with AIK in the 2018–19 season. Showing both defensive and offensive instincts, Broberg appeared in 41 games in the regular season posting 2 goals and 9 points.

With AIK remaining in the Allsvenskan after qualification, Broberg secured a move to the top flight Swedish Hockey League, agreeing to a one-year contract with Skellefteå AIK on 17 May 2019.

On 21 June 2019, Broberg was drafted 8th overall by the Edmonton Oilers in the 2019 NHL Entry Draft. He was signed to a three-year, entry-level contract with the Oilers on 4 July 2019. Approaching the 2019–20 season, Broberg announced he would remain in Sweden to play in the SHL with Skellefteå AIK to continue his development.

Broberg was included on the Oilers roster for Phase 4 of the NHL's return to play after Mike Green opted out, joining the team for the Stanley Cup qualifiers. Following Edmonton's elimination, Broberg was returned to Skellefteå on loan until the start of the 2020–21 NHL season.

With the NHL season delayed due to the ongoing pandemic, Broberg remained with Skellefteå for the duration of the 2020–21 season, he recorded 3 goals and 13 points in 44 regular season games before making his post-season debut with Skellefteå going scoreless in 12 games. On 3 May 2021, he was returned to the Oilers, assigned to the club's taxi squad nearing the completion of the regular season.

Broberg started the 2021–22 season with the Bakersfield Condors, the Oilers' AHL affiliate. He played his first NHL game on 20 November 2021 against the Chicago Blackhawks, scoring an assist in the Oilers' 5–2 home victory. He player 23 games for the Oilers in the regular season, notably scoring his first NHL goal in the second half of the season following improvements under new coach Jay Woodcroft. He also appeared in one Stanley Cup playoff game, as part of the Oilers' deep run to the Western Conference Final.

Career statistics

Regular season and playoffs

International

References

External links
 

2001 births
Living people
AIK IF players
Bakersfield Condors players
Edmonton Oilers draft picks
Edmonton Oilers players
National Hockey League first-round draft picks
Sportspeople from Örebro
Skellefteå AIK players
Swedish ice hockey defencemen